Giorgio Corona (born 15 May 1974) is an Italian former professional footballer who played as a forward.

Career
Corona joined Brindisi in 2002 in co-ownership deal, from Messina. In 2003 Brindisi acquired the remain 50% registration rights. He then joined Catanzaro in 2003. In June 2006 he was signed by Calcio Catania.

He joined Mantova in July 2007. In 2009, he left for Taranto. In 2010, he was signed by Juve Stabia, winning the promotion playoffs to Serie B.

In August 2011 he terminated his contract with Taranto and returned to Sicily for Serie D club A.C.R. Messina.

He retired in 2018 after having played for Atletico Catania.

Personal life
Corona's son Giacomo (born 2004) followed on his father's footsteps, and is currently a youth player for Palermo, being also included as part of the first team squad for the 2021–22 Serie C season.

References

External links
Career profile (from AC Mantova website) 
Career profile (from La Gazzetta dello Sport website) 

Italian footballers
Serie A players
Serie B players
A.C.R. Messina players
S.S.C. Giugliano players
S.S.D. Città di Brindisi players
U.S. Catanzaro 1929 players
Mantova 1911 players
Catania S.S.D. players
Taranto F.C. 1927 players
S.S. Juve Stabia players
Association football forwards
Footballers from Palermo
1974 births
Living people